Ashley MacKenzie is the son of Kelvin MacKenzie. Ashley worked as sales director at Talksport when Kelvin was in charge of the station. In July 2014 it was announced that Base79 was being sold to Rightster, with Ashley MacKenzie earning £7 million from the deal.

References

British chief executives
British media executives
Year of birth missing (living people)
Living people